Dobrzykowice  is a village in the administrative district of Gmina Czernica, within Wrocław County, Lower Silesian Voivodeship, in south-western Poland.

Demography

According to the National Census (March 2011), there were 1114 inhabitants, making Dobrzykowice the fourth largest village of Gmina Czernica.

History

In 1946, the town was incorporated into the newly formed Wroclaw Voivodship in post-war Poland. The German-speaking population living in the village was displaced to Germany.

References

Villages in Wrocław County